Nettippattom is a 1991 Indian Malayalam-language film, directed by Kaladharan and produced by Balagopalan Thampi. The film stars Sreenivasan, Rekha, Sukumari, Jagathy Sreekumar, Manoj K. Jayan, K. P. A. C. Lalitha, Vijayaraghavan, Oduvil Unnikrishnan, Jagadish, Kumbalathu Padmakumar. The film's musical score is by Johnson.

Plot
Peethambaran is an educated man who is involved in the problems of his village. He does not look after his family. He is both partially fooled by the villagers and his friends for their own good. While doing charity, he meets Indu. Later he contests in local elections by compulsion of his friends in which he loses. He also loses his property deeds to a friend who cheated him. Meanwhile, Indu's family proposes a boy from their family to Peethambaran's sister. They also proposed to marry Indu with Peethambaran as they belong to an aristrocratic family though now in poor financial conditions. He gets married. In the end, he tries to change for Indu and denies to help his friend Jocky, whose sister was cheated to avenge an act of Peethambaran and friends to shut down a ration shop. However, Indu as a working women wants him not to sacrifice his identify while not keeping her waiting for ever for him.

Cast

Sreenivasan as Peethambaran
Rekha as Indu
Jagadish as Jocky 
Jagathy Sreekumar as Ummini Pillai
Manoj K. Jayan as Freddy
K. P. A. C. Lalitha as Peethambaran's mother
Nedumudi Venu as Kumaran
Sukumari as Jocky's Mummy
Sankaradi as Achuthan Nair
James as Devan
Krishnankutty Nair as Indu's Father
Kumbalathu Padmakumar as Postman
Beena Antony as Sandhya
Bobby Kottarakkara as Dhamu aka Madantha
Oduvil Unnikrishnan as Avarachan
Kothuku Nanappan as Peethambaran's uncle
Poojappura Ravi as Police Sub Inspector
Vijayaraghavan as Sugunan
T. P. Madhavan
Adinad Sasi as Shanthappan
Sandra Thomas
Sabnam

Soundtrack
The music was composed by Johnson and the lyrics were written by Bichu Thirumala.

References

External links
 

1991 films
1990s Malayalam-language films
Films directed by Kaladharan